Salvatore Francis Martin Piro (June 29, 1950 – January 22, 2023) was an American actor who was the president of The Rocky Horror Picture Show Fan Club, a position he held from 1977 until his death.

Piro was a part of the original Waverly Theatre audience, from which the unique audience participation elements and much of the film's cult following were born. This following has become a worldwide phenomenon.

Piro appeared as himself in the film Fame as well as a number of documentaries, and had a nonspeaking, unnamed cameo as a man using a payphone in Rocky Horrors pseudo sequel Shock Treatment. He also cameoed as The Photographer in the 2016 television remake of The Rocky Horror Picture Show. As an actor, he performed in both film and television.

Piro wrote two books on the Rocky Horror cult following, Creatures of the Night and Creatures of the Night II.

Personal life
Salvatore Francis Martin Piro was born in Jersey City, New Jersey, in 1950. He attended Seton Hall University, but did not receive a degree. In the mid-1970s, he was a theology teacher and theater director at Catholic schools in New Jersey.

In Cherry Grove, New York, on Fire Island, Piro managed the Ice Palace and Grove Hotel for 23 years and executive produced the Miss Fire Island Pageant, Mr. Fire Island Leather, and the Miss Grove Hotel contest. He also played competitive tournament chess and Scrabble.

Piro died from an aneurysm at his home in Manhattan on January 22, 2023, at the age of 72.

References

External links

 Official Facebook fan page
 The Rocky Horror Picture Show Official Fan Site
 
 

1950 births
2023 deaths
20th-century American educators
20th-century American male actors
20th-century American male writers
20th-century American non-fiction writers
American Scrabble players
American gay actors
American gay writers
American male film actors
American male non-fiction writers
American male television actors
American non-fiction writers
American people of Italian descent
LGBT people from New Jersey
LGBT people from New York (state)
Male actors from Jersey City, New Jersey
Rocky Horror
Writers from Jersey City, New Jersey
Deaths from aneurysm